Rostyslav Feshchuk (born May 1, 1990) is an alpine skier from Ukraine.  He competed for Ukraine at the 2010 Winter Olympics.  His best result was a 39th place in the slalom.

Performances

References

External links

1990 births
Living people
Ukrainian male alpine skiers
Olympic alpine skiers of Ukraine
Alpine skiers at the 2010 Winter Olympics
Sportspeople from Kyiv